Libiš is a municipality and village in Mělník District in the Central Bohemian Region of the Czech Republic. It has about 2,300 inhabitants.

Etymology
The name was derived from the personal name Libich.

Geography
It lies in a flat landscape in the Central Elbe Table. The Elbe River flows along the municipal border. Part of the Úpor – Černínovsko Nature Reserve is located in the municipal territory.

History
The first written mention of Libiš is from 1323. Until the end of the World War I, it was purely an agricultural village.

Sights
There are two churches in Libiš. The Church of Saint James the Great was built int he Gothic style in 1391 and modified in the 16th and 17th centuries. A separate wooden bell tower stands next to the church.

The Evangelical church was built in the Baroque style in 1789–1803.

References

External links

Villages in Mělník District